Les Moutiers-en-Retz (literally Les Moutiers in Retz) is a commune in the Loire-Atlantique department in western France.

Climate
In 2020, the town was classified as having an “oceanic climate” type using the classification established by Météo-France, which only has five main types of climates for mainland France. This type of climate is characterised by mild temperatures and relatively abundant rainfall (in conjunction with disturbances from the Atlantic), distributed throughout the year with a slight maximum from October to February.

The climatic parameters which made it possible to establish the 2010 typology include six variables for temperature and eight for precipitation, the values of which correspond to the monthly data for the 1971–2000 norm. The seven main variables characterising the municipality are presented in the box below.

These variables have evolved with climate change. These changes have been recorded on the nearest Météo-France meteorological station in Pornic, in service since 1919, 10km north of Moutiers-en-Retz, where the mean annual temperature is 13°C and the rainfall is 738.1 mm for the period 1981–2010. At the next closest historical meteorological station, "Nantes-Bouguenais", 31 km east inland of Moutiers-en-Retz in the town of Bouguenais, operational since 1945, the annual average temperature changes by 12.2 °C for the period 1971–2000, 12.5 °C for 1981–2010, then 12.7 °C for 1991–2020.

Population

Transport
Les Moutiers-en-Retz station is served by train services between Pornic and Nantes.

See also
Communes of the Loire-Atlantique department

Notes

References

Communes of Loire-Atlantique
Pornic Agglo Pays de Retz